Motor Mile Speedway (formerly Pulaski County Speedway, then New River Valley Speedway) is a 0.416-mile paved oval racetrack in Dublin, Virginia. It was purchased by Shelor Automotive Group in 2004 and was subsequently renamed Motor Mile Speedway.

History
The track announced that it has cut all sanctions with NASCAR and discontinued its oval track racing in late 2017 but, reopened under NASCAR sanctioning in 2019. However, it continues to use its drag strip behind the back straightaway. In late 2020, the Rusty Wallace Racing Experience signed an agreement to become operator of the track for at least the next two years, with plans to run regular oval- and drag-racing experiences at the track.

Motor Mile Speedway hosted one NASCAR Busch North Series event in 2005. And 3 NASCAR Whelen Southern Modified Tour races between 2005 and 2006.

The facility also hosted 21 X-1R Pro Cup Series races from 1998 until 2014, 2 CARS Super Late Model Tour events in 2015 and 2019 and 2 CARS Late Model Stock Tour races, also in 2015 and 2019. The track started hosting the CARS Tour once again in 2021 along with the SMART Modified Tour.

Motor Mile Speedway hosted one ASA National Tour event in 1999.

Notable weekly drivers
Jeff Agnew won four track titles

NASCAR Busch Series history
The track is most famous for hosting 4 NASCAR Busch Series events between 1989 and 1992.

References

External links
Motor Mile Speedway Official Website
Motor Mile Speedway archive at Racing-Reference

Buildings and structures in Pulaski County, Virginia
Motorsport venues in Virginia
NASCAR tracks